The Eratosthenes Seamount or Eratosthenes Tablemount is a seamount in the Eastern Mediterranean, in the Levantine basin about  south of western Cyprus. Unlike most seamounts, it is a carbonate platform not a volcano. It is one of the largest features on the Eastern Mediterranean seafloor.

In 2010 and 2012 the Ocean Exploration Trust's vessel EV Nautilus explored the seamount looking for shipwrecks. Three were found; two were Ottoman vessels from the 19th century and the third was from the 4th century BC. Such seamounts are considered to be ideal for the preservation of shipwrecks because at depths of around  the areas are not disturbed by trawlers or by sediments coming off land.

Oceanography 
It was surveyed by oceanographic cruises notably in  1995, 2000, 2001 and 2009.

Geology 

See also
 CenSeam
 Ferdinandea
 Eratosthenes (crater)

References

External links
 Mart, Yossi and Robertson, Alastair H. F. (1998). Eratosthenes Seamount: an oceanographic yardstick recording the Late Mesozoic-Tertiary geological history of the Eastern Mediterranean, in Robertson, A.H.F., Emeis, K.-C., Richter, C., and Camerlenghi, A. (eds.), Proceedings of the Ocean Drilling Program, Scientific Results, Vol. 160, Chapter 52, 701–708.
 Kempler, Ditza (1998). Eratosthenes Seamount: the possible spearhead of incipient continental collision in the Eastern Mediterranean, in Robertson, A.H.F., Emeis, K.-C., Richter, C., and Camerlenghi, A. (eds.), Proceedings of the Ocean Drilling Program, Scientific Results, Vol. 160, Chapter 53, 709–721.
 Earthref entry

Seamounts of the Mediterranean
Physical oceanography
Continental fragments